Nossa Senhora do Socorro is a municipality located in the Brazilian state of Sergipe.

References

Municipalities in Sergipe
Populated places established in 1868